This is a list of the municipal boroughs, urban districts, and rural districts in Wales immediately prior to the coming into force of the Local Government Act 1972 in 1974.  The number of districts gradually reduced from their creation in 1894 through consolidation.

In addition to these 164 local government sub divisions of the 13 County Councils, Wales also had 4 county boroughs, Cardiff, Swansea, Newport  and Merthyr Tydfil. Following the establishment of the Welsh Office in 1966, and subsequent legislative processes, the question of whether Monmouthshire (including Newport) should be considered as being within Wales was no longer in serious dispute, and it was finally conclusively resolved by the Local Government Act 1972.

Anglesey

Brecon (Brecknockshire)

Caernarvonshire

Cardiganshire

Carmarthenshire

Denbighshire

Flintshire

Glamorgan (Glamorganshire)

Merioneth (Merionethshire)

Monmouthshire

Newport was a county borough.

Montgomeryshire

Pembrokeshire

Radnorshire

See also
List of rural and urban districts in England in 1973
List of rural and urban districts in Northern Ireland
List of local government areas in Scotland 1930–75

References
Local Government Act 1972

 
Rural and urban districts